186 Dollars to Freedom (also titled The City of Gardens and City of Gardens) is a Peruvian-American action drama film written by Monty Fisher and Camilo Vila, directed by Vila and starring John Robinson, Alex Meraz, Michael DeLorenzo, Johnny Lewis, Deborah Kara Unger and Grant Bowler.

Cast
John Robinson as Wayne
Michael DeLorenzo as Gutierrez
Alex Meraz as Nicaragua
Johnny Lewis as Jorge
Grant Bowler as Jesus Christ
Anahí de Cárdenas as Maritza
David Michie as Colonel Ramos
Deborah Kara Unger as Consul Powers

Production
Filming occurred in Peru in May 2010.  Filming also occurred in Los Angeles in June 2010.

Release
The film was released at the WorldFest-Houston International Film Festival on April 20, 2012.  Then it was released in Manhattan on September 21, 2012.

Reception
John Anderson of Variety gave the film a positive review and wrote that "the characters are solid and the action sound, suggesting the film will do short time theatrically en route to ancillary rehab."

Jeannette Catsoulis of The New York Times gave the film a negative review and wrote, "Unable to shape these events into a dramatic structure, the director, Camilo Vila, resorts to a meandering tale of random indignities suffered by a lead so bland he comes across less as principled than as stupendously naïve."

References

External links